Breamore railway station was a railway station in the Avon Valley at the village of Breamore, Hampshire, England. The station was built for the Salisbury and Dorset Junction Railway and opened in 1866. British Railways closed the station and the line on 2 May 1964.

The station has survived intact, and in recent years has been refurbished. Five affordable homes were built for the Hampshire Alliance for Rural Affordable Housing (HARAH) on one of the disused platforms, being completed in December 2012.

A 2-mile section of the disused railway line which passes through the station has been converted into a footpath

Further reading

References

External links

Beeching closures in England
Disused railway stations in Hampshire
Former London and South Western Railway stations
Railway stations in Great Britain opened in 1866
Railway stations in Great Britain closed in 1964
1866 establishments in England